Paraleptophlebia is a genus of mayflies in the family Leptophlebiidae. Commonly found in North America, Britain, and parts of Western Europe.

Species
These 57 species belong to the genus Paraleptophlebia:

 Paraleptophlebia adoptiva (McDunnough, 1929) i c g
 Paraleptophlebia altana Kilgore and Allen, 1973 i c g
 Paraleptophlebia aquilina Harper and Harper, 1986 i c g
 Paraleptophlebia assimilis (Banks, 1914) i c g
 Paraleptophlebia associata (McDunnough, 1924) i c g
 Paraleptophlebia bicornuta (McDunnough, 1926) i c g b
 Paraleptophlebia bruneipennis (McDunnough, 1924) c g
 Paraleptophlebia brunneipennis (McDunnough, 1924) i
 Paraleptophlebia cachea Day, 1954 i c g
 Paraleptophlebia calcarica Robotham and Allen, 1988 i c g
 Paraleptophlebia californica Traver, 1934 i c g
 Paraleptophlebia cincta (Retzius, 1783) c g
 Paraleptophlebia clara (McDunnough, 1933) i c g
 Paraleptophlebia curvata Ulmer, 1927 c g
 Paraleptophlebia debilis (Walker, 1853) i c g b (mahogany dun)
 Paraleptophlebia erratica Kang & Yang, 1994 c g
 Paraleptophlebia falcula Traver, 1934 i c g
 Paraleptophlebia georgiana Traver, 1934 i c g
 Paraleptophlebia gregalis (Eaton, 1884) i c g
 Paraleptophlebia guttata (McDunnough, 1924) i c g b
 Paraleptophlebia helena Day, 1952 i c g b
 Paraleptophlebia heteronea (McDunnough, 1924) i c g
 Paraleptophlebia japonica Matsumura, 1931 c g
 Paraleptophlebia jeanae Berner, 1955 i c g
 Paraleptophlebia jenseni McCafferty and Kondratieff, 1999 i c g
 Paraleptophlebia kirchneri Kondratieff and Durfee, 1994 i c g
 Paraleptophlebia kunashirica Tiunova, 2017 g
 Paraleptophlebia lacustris Ikonomov, 1962 c g
 Paraleptophlebia longilobata (Tshernova, 1928) c g
 Paraleptophlebia magica Zhou & Zheng, 2004 c g
 Paraleptophlebia memorialis (Eaton, 1884) i c g
 Paraleptophlebia moerens (McDunnough, 1924) i c g
 Paraleptophlebia mollis (Eaton, 1871) i c g
 Paraleptophlebia ontario (McDunnough, 1926) i c g
 Paraleptophlebia packi (Needham, 1927) c g
 Paraleptophlebia packii (Needham, 1927) i
 Paraleptophlebia placeri Mayo, 1939 i c g
 Paraleptophlebia praepedita (Eaton, 1884) i c g b
 Paraleptophlebia quisquilia Day, 1952 i c g
 Paraleptophlebia ruffoi Biancheri, 1956 c g
 Paraleptophlebia rufivenosa (Eaton, 1884) i c g
 Paraleptophlebia sculleni Traver, 1934 i c g
 Paraleptophlebia spina Kang & Yang, 1994 c g
 Paraleptophlebia spinosa Uéno, 1931 c g
 Paraleptophlebia sticta Burks, 1953 i c g
 Paraleptophlebia strandii (Eaton, 1901) c g
 Paraleptophlebia strigula (McDunnough, 1932) i c g b
 Paraleptophlebia submarginata (Stephens, 1835) c g
 Paraleptophlebia swannanoa (Traver, 1932) i c g
 Paraleptophlebia temporalis (McDunnough, 1926) i c g
 Paraleptophlebia traverae McCafferty and Kondratieff, 1999 i c g
 Paraleptophlebia vaciva (Eaton, 1884) i c g b
 Paraleptophlebia vladivostokica Kluge, 1982 c g
 Paraleptophlebia volitans (McDunnough, 1924) i c g
 Paraleptophlebia werneri Ulmer, 1920 c g
 Paraleptophlebia westoni Imanishi, 1937 c g
 Paraleptophlebia zayante Day, 1952 i c g

Data sources: i = ITIS, c = Catalogue of Life, g = GBIF, b = Bugguide.net

References

Mayflies
Mayfly genera
Insects of North America